Rais Kola (also Romanized as Ra’īs Kolā and Ra’īs Kalā) is a village in Lafur Rural District, North Savadkuh County, Mazandaran Province, Iran. At the 2006 census, its population was 519, in 131 families.

References 

Populated places in Savadkuh County